Baikie Castle, was a castle on the shores of the former Loch of Baikie, Angus, Scotland. The castle was owned by the Fenton family from the 13th century until the 15th century, when it passed to the Lyon of Glamis family. The castle was surrounded by a moat, with a drawbridge and stone causeway providing access to the castle. No remains were evident by the 19th century.

Citations

References
Coventry, Martin. (2008) Castles of the Clans: the strongholds and seats of 750 Scottish families and clans. Musselburgh.

Castles in Angus, Scotland
Clan Fenton